Fanny Parkes or Parks (née Frances Susanna Archer) (1794–1875) was a travel writer from Wales, known for her extensive journals about colonial India, where she lived for 24 years. These are recorded in her memoirs Wanderings of a Pilgrim in Search of the Picturesque. In 1970, extracts from her memoirs, Begums, Thugs and White Mughals, became available for the first time since their original appearance in 1850. The first biography, by Barbara Eaton, Fanny Parks: Intrepid Memsahib, appeared in 2018.

Early life and family
Fanny Parkes was born Frances Susanna Archer in Conwy, Wales, the daughter of Ann and Captain William Archer, 16th Lancers. On 25 March 1822 she married Charles Crawford Parks (17 November 1797 – 22 August 1856), a writer for the East India Companies.

Travel writing

Fanny lived in India between 1822 and 1846, with a break in England and Cape Town 1839–1844.

Parkes began living in Calcutta in 1822, before moving to Allahabad ten years later due to her husband's posting. Parks wrote two volumes on her time travelling through India on horseback and befriending people around her, while learning Persian, Hindustani and Urdu. Her detailed memoirs, written in a lively style, reveal independence of mind. Parkes allows an affectionate pre-colonial perspective of northern India and its peoples and customs, recording changes in Britain's governing of India, the economic impact of such policies, and domestic problems in Indian society. People she encountered included wealthy socialites and famine-stricken residents of Kanauj, seen on a trip over mountains from Landour to Simla. Parks' narrative reflects admiration and respect for the richness of Indian culture. It includes a glossary of terms and a collection of translated Indian proverbs.

Some of Parkes's writings cover topics that were controversial at the time. One of the extreme examples was the murder of a woman in sati by those who felt that male heirs were more entitled to her possessions. Parks condemned the event and went on to criticize the laws governing married women in England. Parks also protested about a plan to sell the Taj Mahal, which she compared to Westminster Abbey. Clashing with the lack of respect for Indian culture commonly found in Europe, she described natural beauty in Delhi and Benares, and fascinating dress and cuisine. In one of her last entries, she described feeling disenchanted with Europe after leaving India.

The memoirs were published as Wanderings of a Pilgrim in Search of the Picturesque during four and twenty years in the East with Revelations of Life in the Zenana (Pelham Richardson, 1850). William Dalrymple rediscovered and edited this travelogue as Begums, Thugs & Englishmen. The Journals of Fanny Parkes (Penguin Publishers). Iris Portal referred to Parks as a "kindred spirit" because of her curious writing style and the fact that her book expresses an open-minded approach to Indian customs.

In 1851 she invested money, organised and wrote the catalogue of the "Grand moving diorama of Hindostan, from Fort William, Bengal, to Gangoutri in the Himalaya", which was displayed at the "Asiatic Gallery, Baker Street Bazar, Portman Square. It was so popular that it was also shown in Hull in 1853.

Bibliography
F. Parks, Wanderings of a pilgrim in search of the picturesque, during four-and-twenty years in the East with revelations of life in the zenana, 2 vols (London: Pelham Richardson, 1850)
Begums, Thugs & Englishmen, the journals of Fanny Parkes (London: Sickle Moon Books, 2002)
Barbara Eaton: Fanny Parks: Intrepid Memsahib, A Biography of Fanny Parks (1794–1875). An Independent Traveller in 19th Century India (UK: KDP Paperback and Kindle ebook )

References

Welsh travel writers
People from Kanpur
1794 births
1875 deaths
People from Conwy
British women travel writers
19th-century British writers
19th-century British women writers